Camila Giorgi was the defending champion, having won the previous edition in 2011, but she chose not to participate.

Nicole Gibbs won the all-American final, defeating Melanie Oudin 6–4, 6–4.

Seeds

Main draw

Finals

Top half

Bottom half

References 
 Main draw

Usta Player Development Classic - Singles